Via Maqueda, also known as "Strada Nuova" (New Street), is an important street of Palermo. Together with the Cassaro, it represents the main axis of the historic centre and provides access to a number of important sights, including Teatro Massimo and Fontana Pretoria. The street is named after the Viceroy of Sicily Bernardino de Cárdenas y Portugal, Duque de Maqueda.

History 
In the late sixteenth century the opening of the street was decided. It was conceived as an axis destined to cross the most ancient road of Palermo, the millennial Cassaro. The creation of the street addressed the need of a more sliding traffic and the requests of the nobility, eager to have new spaces for its buildings.

The work was designed in 1577 and completed in 1599, during the period of the Viceroy Maqueda. On 24 July 1600 the street was inaugurated.

Structure 
The street is perfectly straight from Piazza Verdi, near Teatro Massimo, to Porta di Vicari, near the Palermo Centrale railway station. With the Cassaro, Via Maqueda forms the famous Baroque intersection known as Quattro Canti (Piazza Villena). The two streets are also called "Croce Barocca" (Baroque Cross).

Transport 
During daylight hours, the street is pedestrian in the stretch from Piazza Verdi to Quattro Canti.

Places of interest

See also 

 Cassaro
 Porta di Vicari
 Quattro Canti

References

External links 
 Monumental itinerary of Via Maqueda - sicilytourist.com

Maqueda
Tourist attractions in Palermo